Radrodro is a surname. Notable people with the surname include:

Aseri Radrodro (born 1972), Fijian politician
Salote Radrodro (born 1956 or 1957), Fijian politician